Federal Highway 211 (Carretera Federal 211) is a Federal Highway of Mexico. The highway travels from El Jocote, Chiapas in the northeast to Huixtla, Chiapas in the southwest.

References

211